Calvisia is a genus of stick insects in the subfamily Necrosciinae (tribe Necrosciini).  Species are known to be distributed in temperate and tropical Asia.

Species
The Phasmida Species File lists:

Subgenus Calvisia Stål, 1875 
 Calvisia acutegranulosa (Redtenbacher, 1908)
 Calvisia conicipennis (Bates, 1865)
 Calvisia costata (Thunberg, 1815)
 Calvisia fessa Redtenbacher, 1908
 Calvisia kneubuehleri Bresseel & Constant, 2017
 Calvisia lineata Redtenbacher, 1908
 Calvisia medogensis Bi, 1993
 Calvisia sammannani Seow-Choen, 2016
 Calvisia sangarius (Westwood, 1859) - type species (as Necroscia sangarius Westwood)
 Calvisia torquata (Bates, 1865)

Subgenus Conocalvisia Seow-Choen, 2016 
 Calvisia aeruginosa Redtenbacher, 1908
 Calvisia coerulescens Redtenbacher, 1908
 Calvisia fuscoalata Redtenbacher, 1908
 Calvisia hemus (Westwood, 1859)
 Calvisia hilaris (Westwood, 1848)
 Calvisia hippolyte (Westwood, 1859)
 Calvisia leopoldi Werner, 1934
 Calvisia octolineata Redtenbacher, 1908
 Calvisia semihilaris Redtenbacher, 1908
 Calvisia spurcata Redtenbacher, 1908
 Calvisia virbius (Westwood, 1859)

Subgenus Nigracalvisia Seow-Choen, 2016 
 Calvisia abercrombiei Seow-Choen, 2016
 Calvisia albosignata Redtenbacher, 1908
 Calvisia ferruginea Redtenbacher, 1908
 Calvisia flavopennis Seow-Choen, 2016
 Calvisia fordae Seow-Choen, 2016
 Calvisia fuscoviridis Seow-Choen, 2016
 Calvisia grossegranosa Redtenbacher, 1908
 Calvisia nigroaxillaris Günther, 1943
 Calvisia omissa Redtenbacher, 1908
 Calvisia rufescens Redtenbacher, 1908

Subgenus Punctatocalvisia Seow-Choen, 2016 
 Calvisia conspersa Redtenbacher, 1908
 Calvisia hennemanni Seow-Choen, 2016
 Calvisia pseudoscutellum Seow-Choen, 2016

Subgenus Spinocalvisia Seow-Choen, 2016 
 Calvisia medora (Westwood, 1859)
 Calvisia medorina Redtenbacher, 1908

Subgenus Viridocalvisia Seow-Choen, 2016 
 Calvisia aspersa (Redtenbacher, 1908)
 Calvisia bakeri Seow-Choen, 2017
 Calvisia biguttata (Burmeister, 1838)
 Calvisia chani Seow-Choen, 2016
 Calvisia clarissima Redtenbacher, 1908
 Calvisia flavoguttata Redtenbacher, 1908
 Calvisia marmorata (Redtenbacher, 1908)
 Calvisia punctulata Redtenbacher, 1908

References

External links

Phasmatodea genera
Phasmatodea of Asia
Lonchodidae